Vasco Martins is a Cape Verdean musician and composer. Born in Queluz, Portugal, in 1956, he lives now in Calhau, Cape Verde.

Biography
Self-taught, he began his studies in 1974. He was a member of the band Colá in 1976, but then went to Portugal where he studied with Fernando Lopes Graça and later to France to pursue his musical education with Henri-Claude Fantapié. In 1979 he recorded his first LP. He returned to Cape Verde, and it is there that he has created most of his work as a composer and instrumentist, but also as musicologist and producer, he organized and founded the Baía das Gatas Music Festival along with his friends in 1984, the first music festival in the nation.  He released more albums including Quinto Mundo (1989), Eternal Cycle (1995), Memórias Atlânticas (Memories from the Atlantic) (1998) and Lunário Perpétio (2001).  He released 4 Sinfonias in August 2007 which is related to his first four symphonies he made.  His album Lua água clara (Clear Moon Water), a CD was recorded in Paris in 2008.  He later made Li Sin which was released in June 2010, one of his singles were first heard on Praia FM, nearly two years later in January 2012, he released Azuris, the Latin name for Blue  His recent album released was Twelve Moons released in Spring 2014

Other works
Vasco Martins is the first Capeverdean to ever perform symphonies, the first one was related to the Spring Equinox, the second symphony started in 1998 and completed in 2002 and titled Erupção (Eruption), one of them the last eruption at the time which was on Fogo, it was revised in 2004.  The third one was titled Arquipélaco magnético, the Magnetic Archipelago, the fourth one was titled Buda Dharma (Buddha Dharma) made in 2001.  The fifth one was set in the Eastern parts and divided into six parts, the first four were the directions, the other two were in space titled nadir and zenith.  The sixth one was set in his family's island's tallest summit Monte Verde which was also Pandion halieatus.  The seventh one was Alba, the eighth was titled A Procura da Luz (The Search for Light) and the ninth one was for Orchestra which was performed with the Moravian Philharmonic Orchestra.

Martins also made works related to instrumentals including 4 Notes on the City of Mindelo using a solo clarinet.  He also performed chamber music, piano works including Piano Azul (Blue Piano) in 1998, guitar works including the Subtle Desert and electro music.

In 2008 he performed the opera play titled Crioulo (Creole), it premiered at Centro Cultural de Belém (CCB) in Lisbon on March 27, 2009, he was componist and performed the cantata "Lágrimas na Paraise".

He also made three poems including Universo da Ilha (Island Universe) in 1986, Navegam os olhares com o voo do pássaro, in 1989 and Run Shan in 2008.

Interviews
He was interviewed on October 10, 1997 with FM Stéreo and later with the major newspaper A Semana on April 23, 2005

Musical styles
In the Cape Verdean musical panorama, Vasco Martins may be considered unique. A composer who refuses to be labeled, he may be considered a classical musician because of his incursions into symphonic orchestra music, but he may also be considered as a new age musician because of his instrumental compositions, mostly using synthesizers, but in both cases, always inspired by traditional Cape Verdean music.

Compositions

Symphonies

 Symphony No. 1: "Celebração do equinócio de Março" (Celebration of the Spring Equinox)
1998-2002 rev. 2004: Symphony No. 2:: "Erupção" ("Eruption"), for orchestra
 Symphony No. 3 "Arquipélago magnético" (Magnetic Archipelago), for orchestra
 Assim
 melodicamente em três partes
 Final generoso (expressão jubilosa)
2001: Symphony No. 4: "Buda Dharma", ("Buddha Dharma"), for orchestra
Symphony No. 5: "Oriente" ("Eastern"), for orchestra
 norte (North)
 este (East)
 oeste (West)
 sul (South)
 nadir (Nadir)
 zenite (Zenith)
 Symphony No. 6: "Monte Verde" (Pandion halieatus), for orchestra
 Symphony No. 7: "Alba", for orchestra
 Symphony No. 8: "A procura da Luz" (The search for light), for orchestra
 Symphony No. 9, for orchestra

Instrumental music
 4 Notas na cidade do Mindelo (4 Notes on the City of Mindelo), solo clarinet
 Anámnesis, guitar
 Concert, guitar
 Dôs temp p'um valsa, clarinet, in São Vicente Crioulo
 Musique pour adoucir le Coeur, in French

Other works
 1989 Danças de Câncer, symphonic suite
 Abertura (Overture)
 Pulsações (Pulsations)
 Noites mágicas (Magic Nights)
 Terra vulcânica (Volcanic Land)
 A garça por cima das ondas
 Clara Luz, (Clear Light)
 Golfinhos no horizonte
 Oceano no coração (Ocean With a Heart)
 Calmas tardes no Monte Verde (Calm Winds in Monte Verde)
 Tardes caminhando (Afternoons on a Lane)

Discography

Albums
1979: Vibrações (Vibrations)
1985: Para além da noite
1987: Oceano imenso (Immense Ocean)
1989: Quinto mundo
1995: Quiet moments
1995: Ritual periférico (Peripheral Ritual)
1995: Eternal cycle
1996: Island of the secret sounds
1997: Sublime delight
1997: Memórias atlânticas (Atlantic Memories)
1998: Danças de Câncer
2000: Apeiron
2001: Dôs
2001: Lunário perpétuo
2007: 4 sinfonias (4 Symphonies)
2009: Lua água clara (Clear Water Moon)
2010: Li Sin
2012: Azuris
2014: Twelve Moons (CD-r)

Chamber music
Primeiras Meditações (First Meditations), with a flute, cello piano, violin and a guitar
Azul Ibérico (Iberic Blue), string quartet
Azul Caboverdiano (Cape Verdean Blue), string quartet

Piano works
Piano Azul (Blue Piano) (1998)
Amendoeira celeste
Amornando
 Lua de Abril (April Moon)
 Lua de Dezembro (December Moon)
 Luz e sombra no deserto (Light and Sleep in the Desert)
 Memória da água (Memories of Water)
 Orion
 Peregrinações
 Ventos oceânicos (Ocean Winds)

Guitar works
 Deserto subtil (Subtle Desert)
 Estudo (Studies)
 Gesto flutuante
 Molto continuum
 Num varanda
 Prelúdio
 Sattva
 Situações triangulares (Triangular Situations)

Electronic music
 Apeiron
 Divinas of S. Nicolau
 Lunario Perpetuo (Lunar Perpetuary)
 Ocean-Light
 Ocean and Moon
 Sarva Mangalam
 Sublime Delight

Musicals

Operas

Literary works
Música Tradicional Cabo-verdiana (Cape Verdean Traditional Music)
Vol. I - A morna (Vol. I - Morna)

Poems
Universo da Ilha (Island Universe), 1986
Navegam os olhares com o voo do pássaro, 1989
Run Shan, 2008

References

External links
Official website (in Portuguese and English)

1956 births
Living people
Cape Verdean musicians
Cape Verdean composers
Cape Verdean poets
New-age musicians
People from Queluz, Portugal
People from São Vicente, Cape Verde